Lisa McShea and Milagros Sequera were the defending champions, but Sequera did not compete this year. McShea teamed up with Jennifer Russell and lost in first round to Lilia Osterloh and Antonella Serra Zanetti.

Alina Jidkova and Tatiana Perebiynis won the title by defeating Rosa María Andrés Rodríguez and Conchita Martínez Granados 7–5, 6–3 in the final.

Seeds

Draw

Draw

Qualifying

Qualifying seeds

Qualifiers
  Edina Gallovits /  Angela Haynes

Qualifying draw

References
 Official results archive (ITF)
 Official results archive (WTA)

2005 Abierto Mexicano Telcel
Abierto Mexicano Telcel